Atonsu is a town near Assin Fosu in the Assin Central Municipal District in the Central Region of Ghana. It is located along the Cape Coast-Fosu-Kumasi Highway.

Institutions 

 Atonsu Municipal Assembly Basic School

Notable natives 

 Stephen Adu Gyamfi
 Hymo

References 

Central Region (Ghana)
Communities in Ghana